The HP Pavilion dv9000 series was a model series of laptops manufactured by Hewlett-Packard Company with 17.0" 16:10 screens.

Pavilion dv9000
It has NVIDIA GeForce Go 6150 graphics and with an AMD Turion 64X2 CPU. This laptop was featured with an HP Imprint finish, also featured with HP QuickPlay and HP WebCam.

It also has ports that are: Expansion Port 3, Ethernet, 56K Modem, VGA, S-Video, PCMCIA Slot and a SD MS/Pro MMC XD card reader for files.

Pavilion dv9200
17.0" 16:10 screen, Core 2 Duo. (NVIDIA GeForce Go 7600)

Pavilion dv9700

This model featuring a 17.0" display mounted in a clamshell-type case. This model was released in January 2007 and the DV9700 line has been replaced by the larger DV7 series and smaller DV6 series. The specific internal components can be custom-chosen by the consumer or pre-selected by the manufacturer for the retail market. It is comparable to the Dell XPS M1530.

Pavilion dv9700t 
Version with Intel CPU and Intel Crestline PM965 motherboard.

Specifications

 Processor: Penryn-class (45nm) T5550 1.8 GHz, T8100 (SLAUU) 2.1 GHz, T8300 (SLAPU) 2.4 GHz, T9300 2.5 GHz, T9500 2.6 GHz
 Front Side Bus: 667 MHz to 800 MHz (dependent on processor model); The T5550 is limited to 667 MHz.
 Graphics: NVIDIA GeForce 8400M GS (256 MB) or GeForce 8600M GS (512 MB)
 Display: 17.0" 16:10 aspect ratio WXGA (1440 x 900) or WSXGA+ (1680 x 1050) High-Definition "HP BrightView" LCD. The WXGA+ comes in either a single or dual lamp configuration, while the WSXGA+ comes in only a single lamp configuration.
 Video Output: HDMI 1080p, S-video, VGA (resolution depends on graphics display adapter)
 Speakers: Integrated Altec Lansing stereo speakers
 Audio Output: analog and digital. Early releases of this model had three separate audio outputs: one 3.5 mm stereo, one S/PDIF optical, and one HDMI. Newer releases have only two outputs: one 3.5 mm stereo and one HDMI. HP product documentation alludes to this.
 Chipset:  Intel Crestline PM965) featuring I/O Controller Hub 8 (ICH8) southbridge
 BIOS: Phoenix BIOS; that BIOS does not support hardware RAID. (Note: Windows Vista does not support Stripe Volume or Spanned Volume for the system volume, thus eliminating RAID support for this system.)
 Memory: 4 GB maximum, 2 slots DDR2, 1.8 volt unbuffered, asymmetric or interleaved operation supported. Intel specifies that the chipset only supports 533 to 667 MHz memory clock speed is supported however HP Pre-sales telephone support has stated twice that the motherboard supports 533 to 800 MHz memory. The sales team does not differentiate between compatibility and utilization. 800 MHz DDR2 is being installed for orders that include 800 MHz-capable processors.
 Storage: 2 internal SATA drive bays
This laptop is notable for having dual SATA 2.5" hard disk drive expansion bays, which can be used in a RAID configuration.
 Battery: 8 Cell Li-Ion (17.6 Ah) or High Capacity 8  Cell Li-Ion (20.4 Ah)
 Network: Intel PRO/Wireless 4965AGN (with or without Bluetooth)
It also has options for integrated Bluetooth, mobile broadband from the Verizon Wireless V740 ExpressCard, microphone, 1.3 megapixel webcam, and/or fingerprint reader.

 I/O Ports: 4 USB 2.0 (3 on models with fingerprint reader), IEEE 1394 FireWire, PCI expansion port 3 (proprietary bus for docking port), ExpressCard/54, Integrated Consumer IR (remote control receiver), 5-in-1 digital media card reader, microphone in, RJ-11 (modem), RJ-45 (LAN), VGA, TV out (S-video), HDMI. Does not have external SATA port.
 Dimensions (inches): 15.16 length x 11.65 width x 1.57 maximum closed height
 Accessories: remote control, 90 watt AC power adapter
 Dock/Base: The HP xb3000 Notebook Expansion Base is intended for this system.

Performance

Note: current listings are posted from independent testing by author. Updates/revisions are requested from verifiable third-party websites.
 High Capacity Battery: test on an out-of-box model with dual hard drives, 2.4 GHz processor, 4 GB RAM, no external attachments, Wi-Fi enabled, Balanced power plan, approximately 75% screen brightness yielded 2 hours 35 minutes of DVD runtime before system automatically shut down at 5% battery power.
 Windows Vista: test on an out-of-box model with 2.4 GHz processor, 4 GB RAM, 256 MB graphics adapter, 7200RPM hard drives, no external attachments, WIFI enabled, Balanced power plan yielded a Windows Vista Windows Experience Index of 3.4, with the two lowest scores being Graphics (3.4) and Gaming Graphics (4.5). Comparatively, the Dell XPS M1530 with matching configuration yielded a Windows Experience Index of 5.1.
 Windows 7: test on a DV9843cl with 4GB 800 MHz DDR2 RAM, T9500 processor, 512MB 8600GS video, and Samsung SSD 850 Evo 120 HDD resulted in WEI scores of 6.1 on CPU & Memory, 4.9 on Graphics, 5.5 on gaming graphics, and 7.6 on hard disk, resulting in a 4.9 score overall.

Upgrades
Windows 10

Windows 10 runs as well as, if not better than, Windows 7 on the Intel versions of these laptops, but you should upgrade to an SSD if you haven't already.  You can follow the Windows 7 installation information below, but nearly all drivers are included.  If you choose to run the 32-bit version and have the discrete Nvidia graphics (8600GS), you will need the Nvidia 332.21 driver for PAE mode.  The PAE3 patch works in Windows 10.  Follow the Windows 7 installation instructions for installing DigitalPersona if you have a fingerprint scanner.  Install sp45112 for the Ricoh SD card reader.  You will need to block automatic driver updates with the following registry entry:

[HKEY_LOCAL_MACHINE\SOFTWARE\Policies\Microsoft\Windows\WindowsUpdate]"ExcludeWUDriversInQualityUpdate"=dword:00000001

For 64-bit, the fingerprint sensor will need the drivers from sp35583 and DigitalPersona from here and both 32 and 64-bit versions will need the Synaptics touchpad driver from here: 32-bit 64-bit.  The last "Unknown device" is QLB, SP40139.

For a familiar look to Windows 7, install Classic Shell and 8gadgetpack.

Recommended is CoreTemp for overheating protection, and remember to blast out your cooling ducts regularly!

Windows 7

Windows 7 runs very well on these laptops using the Vista drivers from HP's website.  32-bit is recommended, as it runs cooler, quieter and faster, and has less memory overhead than 64-bit.  Use PAE patch for 4GB memory configurations on 32-bit.  This PAE patch is currently confirmed to work with Microsoft monthly security patch rollup through June 2020.

Some drivers may have to be installed manually by bypassing the installer and extracting the files to install directly through device manager, but they will work.  Fingerprint scanner drivers with DigitalPersona works only on 32-bit.  Windows 7 video drivers from NVIDIA's site (for laptops only) can usually be used, however 341.81 of 15-Aug-2015 are not recommended for 8600GS on Windows 7 x86/x64 due to recently discovered sleep and hibernation problems.  332.21 of Dec/19/2013 are the latest that are confirmed to work as of Aug/1/2018, particularly with PAE on 32-bit as NVIDIA broke PAE after this version. 179.48 is recommended for integrated graphics.

The Intel 7260AC 802.11AC wireless card is known to work well in this series of laptops with a BIOS modification to remove the whitelist (it is model-specific, so find the SP number for your specific model's BIOS on hp.com and look for the equivalent SPxxxxx.exe with the whitelist removed). It provides dramatically increased wireless connection speeds of up to 866Mbit/s (2x2).  It is half the size, consumes less power and runs much cooler than the 4965, which is known for getting very hot in operation.

Update 04/27/2021:  The Intel AX200 Wifi 6 802.11ax gigabit wireless card works with Windows 10 64-bit.

An SSD drive is the biggest improvement you can make to this laptop, and is fully supported and highly recommended.  Any 2.5" SATA3 SSD will work with the proper connector adapter specific to these laptops, and though it will run at SATA2 speeds it is still dramatically faster than a mechanical drive on the same interface.

USB 3.0:  A 54mm USB 3.0 ExpressCard is available, sold under various names online using the Renesas uPD720202 chipset, which will give you two genuine, high-speed USB 3.0 ports, with a power adapter to boost the current capability of more-demanding USB 3.0 devices like external 3.5" hard drives.  There is also a 3-port version, but this is known to be problematic with many USB 3.0 devices with higher current demands.

Known design flaws
Display Hinges

HP recalled many notebooks during the period November 2008 - May 2009 for a common fault leading to one or both hinges fracturing. The use of thin flexible aluminium in a critical location of stress and tension to hold up the large LCD screen was a poor choice for a product designed to be opened and closed frequently, with many customers reporting poor customer service from HP's warranty department. One customer even reported a service representative telling her to "just leave the laptop open and don't close the lid, or it may break!". Many customers believe that HP are not standing by their product, only offering a short 6-month period for repairs - which will simply reoccur due to the poor design of this hinge.

The right side hinge will fail - it is not a question of if but when, but it is not difficult or expensive to replace it as long as no other damage occurred when it broke.  You will hear a slight crack sound while closing the lid when it fails.  If you stop using the laptop immediately until you replace the broken hinge, no other damage is likely to occur, but reopening it can destroy the rear cover and this is where it can get more expensive to repair.

OEM hinges were sintered aluminum, and can be distinguished by the shiny silver quality of the lower hinge assembly.  Aftermarket replacements are cast and a dull gray and do not fit properly, nor are threads properly tapped into the right side mounting holes.

Overheating

These laptops are notorious for having an overheating problem.  It's caused by the cooling fan having no filter and sucking up dust, debris and hair from dirty environments, clogging up its heat sinks and exhaust port, then accidentally blocking the fan intake vents until it overheats.  Worse, the entire laptop must be completely disassembled and the motherboard entirely removed to access the area that gets clogged up.  Regularly blasting compressed air into the exhaust port on the left rear side (below the VGA & expansion ports) while it's running will help, but if you typically see idle temps above 115-120 deg F you've got a problem and need to clean it out.  Once apart and cleaned, placing a 2" square piece of speaker grill fabric between the fan and the intake vents on the bottom of the chassis will alleviate the problem.  After cleaning you should see 85-95F idle temps depending on processor.

References

External links
 DV9700 manual by HP
 Intel Processor Finder
 Intel chipset information
 HP Product Information webpage
 HP Product Manuals

Pavilion dv9700